Turpachita is a village in Osh Region of Kyrgyzstan.

Nearby towns and villages include Aktash (5 miles), Kichik-Alay (6 miles) and Kashkasu (7 miles).

References

External links 
 Satellite map at Maplandia.com

Populated places in Osh Region